Agrionoptera longitudinalis biserialis known as the striped swampdragon is a subspecies of dragonfly in the family Libellulidae.
It is found in Australia and New Guinea. Its usual habitat is in the vicinity of shaded pools and tree holes.

Agrionoptera longitudinalis biserialis is a large dragonfly (wingspan 100mm, length 55mm), with a prominent yellow stripe on its synthorax, and yellow markings on a dark abdomen. The frons is a bright metallic green. Its range in Australia is from the tip of Cape York Peninsula to around Rockhampton on the central Queensland coast.
The species has not yet been assessed in the IUCN Red List, but is listed in the Catalog of Life

Gallery

See also
 List of Odonata species of Australia

References

Libellulidae
Odonata of Australia
Insects of Australia
Insects of New Guinea
Taxa named by Edmond de Sélys Longchamps
Insects described in 1879